"To Be Free" is a song recorded by Australian record producer L D R U, and was released in February 2017 as the third single from L D R U's debut studio album, Sizzlar (2017). 

The song was certified gold in Australia in 2019.

Track listing
Digital download
 "To Be Free" – 3:15

Digital download
 "To Be Free" (SNBRN remix) – 4:40

Certification

References

2017 songs
2017 singles
L D R U songs
Australian pop songs
Songs written by Alexander Burnett (musician)
Songs written by Anita Blay